The Royal Chiangmai Golf Club is a golf resort in Chiang Mai, Thailand. Among other sports facilities it includes a Cricket Oval.

Cricket 

The first ICC International match was held on 20 November, 2022 when the Netherlands Women's Cricket team held a bilateral series with the Thailand Women's Cricket team. The ground was approved for both a One Day International game and Twenty20 International game.

International Record

Women's One-Day International centuries 
The following table summarizes the WODI centuries scored at this venue.

Women's One-Day International five-wicket hauls 
The following table summarizes the five-wicket hauls taken in WODIs at this venue.

References 

Cricket grounds in Thailand
Golf clubs and courses in Thailand
Buildings and structures in Chiang Mai province